, also known as Hammy, is the former director of the Scuderia Ferrari F1 Team Tyre Development. He previously worked for Bridgestone as the director of its Motorsport Tyre Development until 2011.

Career

Bridgestone
After graduating from Tokyo University of Agriculture and Technology in a master's course in macromolecular chemistry, Hamashima joined a Japanese tire company, Bridgestone, in 1977.

He has consistently worked on the development of tires for motor sports since 1981. He worked in many racing categories, such as Formula Two, DTM, the Indianapolis 500, Formula One and MotoGP.

During the Formula One era, he often appeared on the Fuji TV's F1 program even in Grands Prix weekends and commented as a tire engineer, about the compatibility of the circuit and the tire, and other related matters. Thus, he became well known among Formula One fans in Japan.

Scuderia Ferrari
On 11 January 2012, Scuderia Ferrari announced that Hamashima moved to the team and took a role in its technical department to improve the interaction of the Ferrari car and its tires. Hamashima left Ferrari at the end of 2014.

Later efforts 
On 5 March 2015, MediaDo Kageyama Racing (owned by Masahiko Kageyama, who finished in 3rd place at the 1998 24 Hours of Le Mans with Kazuyoshi Hoshino and Aguri Suzuki) announced that Hamashima had become a special advisor to the team.

In January 2016, he joined CERUMO taking part in Super Formula and Super GT, and he became the team principal.

References

Books

External links 
 Bridgestone Motorsport - 
 Hirohide Hamashima's Grands Prix preview 2010 - 
 Hirohide Hamashima's Grands Prix preview 2009 - 
 Hirohide Hamashima's Grands Prix preview 2008 - 
 Hirohide Hamashima's Grands Prix preview 2007 - 
 Hirohide Hamashima's Grands Prix preview 2006 - 
 Hirohide Hamashima talks about Formula One drivers - 

1952 births
Living people
People from Tokyo
Formula One people
Japanese automotive engineers
Japanese motorsport people
Japanese chemical engineers
Bridgestone people
Ferrari people
Tokyo University of Agriculture and Technology alumni